Hedong is a town of southern Zhuolu County in northwestern Hebei province, located  south of the county seat,   west of central Beijing, and about  southeast of Zhangjiakou as the crow flies. , it has 40 villages under its administration.

See also
List of township-level divisions of Hebei

References

Township-level divisions of Hebei
Zhuolu County